Pharmacognosy Communications is a peer-reviewed open-access pharmacy journal published by EManuscript Services on behalf of the Pharmacognosy Network Worldwide. It is a quarterly publication edited by pharmacognosist Ian Edwin Cock, Griffith University, Australia. It publishes articles on the subjects of pharmacognosy, natural products, phytochemistry, and phytomedicine.

The journal is indexed with CAB Abstracts, Chemical Abstracts, EBSCO, Google Scholar, Index Copernicus, OpenJGate, ProQuest, and Ulrich's Periodicals Directory.

Phcog.net (Pharmacognosy Network Worldwide) appeared on Beall's list from October 2012 through September 12, 2015.

References

External links 
 
 Phcog.Net 

Open access journals
English-language journals
Pharmacognosy
Publications established in 2010